José María Francisco Silvestre Santocildes y de Llanos (29 June 1771–6 March 1847) was a Spanish noble, field marshal and general during the Peninsular War.

Early career
Santocildes was born in Barcelona.

Peninsular War

He commanded the Spanish garrison during the Siege of Astorga in 1810.

Post-war career
In 1814, after the war, he was appointed Jefe del Estado Mayor General del Ejército.

Santocildes died in Barcelona.

References

Bibliography
. 
"El Coronel Santocildes: Un Heroe Humilde". 
 Glover, Michael. The Peninsular War 1807-1814. London: Penguin, 2001. 
 Smith, Digby. The Napoleonic Wars Data Book. London: Greenhill, 1998. 

1771 births
1847 deaths
Spanish generals
Spanish commanders of the Napoleonic Wars
People from Barcelona